Liz Marshall is a Canadian filmmaker based in Toronto. Since the 1990s, she has directed and produced independent projects and been part of film and television teams, creating broadcast, theatrical, campaign and cross-platform documentaries shot around the world. Marshall's feature length documentaries largely focus on social justice and environmental themes through strong characters. She is known for The Ghosts in Our Machine and for Water on the Table, for which she also produced impact and engagement campaigns, and attended many global events as a public speaker. Water on the Table features water rights activist, author and public figure Maude Barlow. The Ghosts in Our Machine features animal rights activist, photojournalist and author Jo-Anne McArthur.

Biography

In the early 1990s, Liz Marshall studied film, video and photography in the Media Arts program at Ryerson University in Toronto. She has since worked as a director, writer, producer, executive producer, videographer and cinematographer, often collaborating with award-winning filmmakers and producers. Her body of work includes productions featuring musicians, dancers and authors, as well as documentaries for organizations. Marshall often assembles production teams under the auspices of her company LizMars Productions.

Clients, employers, broadcasters and partner organizations have included: Righteous Babe Records; CHUM Limited television channels Bravo!, MuchMusic, BookTelevision; War Child Canada; The Griffin Trust for Excellence in Poetry; Canadian Journalists for Free Expression; Right To Play; the Stephen Lewis Foundation; Plan Canada; MTV Canada; CTV; the Independent Film Channel; W Network; TVO; Knowledge Network; CBC; Fusion Network; Netflix; the Animal Legal Defense Fund; the New England Anti-Vivisection Society; Animal Equality UK; We Animals; Farm Sanctuary; Women Make Movies; the Bertha BRITDOC Connect Fund and Viceland.

As an active member of the Canadian film community, Marshall has served for three terms (2011-2016) as an elected board member of the Toronto chapter of the Documentary Organization of Canada, which formed the DOC Institute, the collective voice for Toronto’s indie documentary filmmakers. She is a core member of the Toronto chapter of Film Fatales, a global collective of female directors dedicated to the creation of more films and television by and about women.

In 1995, American folk singer-songwriter Ani DiFranco and her independent record label Righteous Babe Records commissioned Liz Marshall to document Ani on tour in parts of Canada and the US. Marshall directed a multimedia archival collage consisting of super 8mm, 16mm film, hi-8 video, and DAT recordings.

In 2013, Marshall declined a Queen Elizabeth II Diamond Jubilee Medal along with Maude Barlow, Naomi Klein and Sarah Slean.

In 2017, Marshall completed her Master of Fine Arts in Cinema Production at York University.

Filmography

Documentaries

 Meat the Future (2020)
The Ghosts in Our Machine (2013) (featuring Jo-Anne McArthur) 
(Director, producer, writer, co-cinematographer)

Water on the Table (2010) (featuring Maude Barlow) 
(Director, producer, writer, co-cinematographer) 
 
The Rawside of... the Bourbon Tabernacle Choir (2008)
(Director)

Girls of Latitude (2008) (featuring Nicole Holness, Diane Salema, and Aliya-Jasmine Sovani)  
(Director)

HIV/AIDS Trilogy (2007) for the Stephen Lewis Foundation
(Director, Producer) 
Grandmothers: The Unsung Heroes of Africa / 
A Generation of Orphans / 
Women: The Face of AIDS /

Inside Your Threads (2004) (featuring Hawksley Workman, Jully Black, Sam Roberts)
(Co-Director, Cinematographer)

Voices of Dissent: The Struggle For Freedom of Expression in Turkey (2002) (featuring Daniel Richler) 
(Director, Producer)

Musicians in the War Zone (2001) (featuring The Rascalz, David Usher, Chantal Kreviazuk, Raine Maida)
(Director, Cross-Platform Field Producer)

Shorts and music videos

Mawal Saba (2007) (featuring Maryem Hassan Tollar)
(Director)

Listen (2005) (featuring Sexsmith & Kerr – Ron Sexsmith and Don Kerr)
(Director)

The Weight of Memory (2001) (featuring Peggy Baker)
(Director)

Messages: To the World's Leaders (2000) (for War Child Canada)
(Director, Producer)

Ani Does Laundry (1997) (featuring Ani DiFranco)
(Director, producer, Writer)

Chemical Valley (1995) (featuring Kyp Harness) 
(Director)

Awards, nominations and distinctions

2015
For The Ghosts in Our Machine

Donald Brittain Award for Best Social/Political Documentary, Canadian Screen Awards nomination
(Shared with fellow Producer Nina Beveridge) 
Best Direction in a Documentary Program, Canadian Screen Awards nomination
Best Photography in a Documentary Program, Canadian Screen Awards nomination
(Shared with fellow Cinematographers John Price, Iris Ng, Nicholas de Pencier) 
Best Sound in a Documentary Program, Canadian Screen Awards
(Garrett Kerr, Daniel Pellerin, Jason Milligan)

2014
For The Ghosts in Our Machine

Official Honoree, 18th Annual Webby Awards, Best Use of Interactive Video
(Shared with Interactive Directors The Goggles, and fellow Interactive Producers Nina Beveridge, Sean Embury)  
Shortlist, International LUSH Prize

2013
For The Ghosts in Our Machine

Top Transformational Film, Viewers Choice Award
Top Ten Audience Favourite Award, Hot Docs Film Festival 
Best Nature/Environment Golden Sheaf Award, Yorkton Film Festival
Special Jury Prize – International Competition, DMZ Docs
Best Canadian Feature, Planet in Focus Environmental Film Festival 
Green Screen Award, 2nd place, Planet in Focus Environmental Film Festival
Top Twenty Audience Favourite Award, IDFA 
Best Director in a Documentary, nomination, Yorkton Film Festival

2012

Queen Elizabeth II Diamond Jubilee Medal
Marshall respectfully declined the honour in support of the Idle No More movement.

2011
For Water on the Table

Honourable Mention, Canada's Environmental Media Awards
Featured Canadian Film for Cinema Politica

2010
For Water on the Table

Best Canadian Feature award, Planet in Focus Environmental Film Festival 
Donald Brittain Award for Best Social/Political Documentary, Gemini Award nomination

2005
For Inside Your Threads

(Produced by Tania Natscheff of MuchMusic)

Shortlisted for the CIDA Deborah Fletcher Award
Gold medal, Canadian Association of Broadcasters (CAB)
Bronze medal, New York International Film Festival

2001
For Musicians in the War Zone

(Produced by Dr. Samantha Nutt, Eric Hoskins of War Child Canada, and Denise Donlon, Tania Natscheff of MuchMusic) 
Gold medal, Cable in the Classroom
Gold medal, Canadian Association of Broadcasters (CAB)
Bronze medal, New York International Film Festival

References

External links
LizMars Productions official web site
The Ghosts in Our Machine official web site
The Ghosts In Our Machine at the Internet Movie Database
The Ghosts in Our Machine – BBC interview
Water On the Table trailer

A Portrait of HIV/AIDS in Sub-Saharan Africa, Liz Marshall's photo essay in Walrus Magazine
Musicians in the War Zone full documentary

Living people
Canadian documentary film directors
Canadian women film directors
Film directors from Toronto
Toronto Metropolitan University alumni
York University alumni
Canadian Film Centre alumni
Year of birth missing (living people)
Canadian women documentary filmmakers